My Wife's Family is a 1956 British comedy film directed by Gilbert Gunn and starring Ronald Shiner as Doc Knott, Ted Ray, Greta Gynt, Diane Hart and Robertson Hare. It was a remake of the 1941 British film My Wife's Family, and is the third British film of the stage farce of the same name by actor Fred Duprez.

Plot
Jack Gay, a newlywed with a dominating mother-in-law attempts to surprise his wife Stella with a baby grand piano, but when she overhears him discussing it, she mistakes it for an illegitimate child, particularly with the arrival of his ex-girlfriend, the blonde and glamorous Gloria Marsh.

Cast
Ronald Shiner as Doc Knott	
Ted Ray as Jack Gay
Diane Hart as Stella Gay
Fabia Drake as Arabella
Greta Gynt as Gloria Marsh 
Robertson Hare as Noah 
Zena Marshall as Hilda
Jessica Cairns as Irma
Benny Lee as Arnold 
Jimmy Mageean as Dobson
Gilbert Harding as Himself

Critical reception
TV Guide wrote, "The third screen version of Fred Duprez's play proves once and for all there's no hope of reviving the dead...Overplayed without shame, but that doesn't help the ancient jokes any." Sky Movies noted a "broad comedy, with Ronald Shiner and Ted Ray extracting the maximum number of laughs out of the mother-in-law-coming-to-stay situation. Fabia Drake gives a sharply-observed portrait of the old battleaxe."

References

1956 films
1956 comedy films
British comedy films
Films shot at Associated British Studios
Films with screenplays by Talbot Rothwell
British films based on plays
Remakes of British films
1950s English-language films
Films directed by Gilbert Gunn
1950s British films
English-language comedy films